ESAG may refer to:
 École Suisse d'Archéologie en Grèce (Swiss School of Archaeology in Greece)
 École supérieure de design, d'art graphique et d'architecture intérieure (Penninghen school or ESAG Penninghen), a high school in Paris
 Expression site associated gene, a gene found in the bloodstream expression site of the variable surface glycoproteins of the sleeping sickness parasite, Trypanosoma brucei
European Society of Aesthetic Gynecology
Eksperimentinė sportinės aviacijos gamykla (Lithuanian glider manufacturer later privatized as Sportinė Aviacija)